Oziel Toscano Jasso (born December 20, 1973) is a Mexican professional wrestler, or Luchador as they are known in Spanish. He has achieved most success under the ring names Tarzan Boy and Toscano. After making his professional wrestling debut in 1993 he has worked for a number of notable professional wrestling promotions in and outside of Mexico such as Consejo Mundial de Lucha Libre, AAA, the World Wrestling Federation, International Wrestling Revolution Group, and Promo Azteca. Toscano's ring character is that of a Latin hearth-throb. He has also competed under the ring names Armando Fernandez, Baby Toscano/Babe Toscano, Tarzan Toscano, and Zorro during his career.

Toscano was one of the original founders of the Los Guerreros del Infierno group in 2001 and was a member off and on until 2008. He later helped create the La Furia del Norte group that morphed into the Los Perros del Mal group. He was later part of AAA's El Consejo group, with other former CMLL wrestlers. During his career he has been a one-time NWA World Light Heavyweight Champion, a two-time CMLL World Trios Champion (with Héctor Garza/El Terrible and Último Guerrero/Atlantis), and holder of the AAA World Trios Champion. He also won the 2003 Leyenda de Plata tournament.

Professional wrestling career
Toscano made his in-ring debut on November 27, 1993, after being trained by local Monterrey trainer Blue Fish. He initially adopted the ring name Babe Toscano (sometimes "Baby Toscano"), working for the local Federacion International de Lucha Libre (FILL) promotion. By 1995 Toscano, Humberto Garza Jr., and El Region defeated Los Ku Klux Klan in a Lucha de Apuestas to unmask them, and then followed up with another victory a week later that forced Los Ku Klux Klan to be shaved bald as a result of losing a second Lucha de Apuestas match.

Promo Azteca (1996–1997)
By late 1996, Toscano began working for Promo Azteca. Initially, he wrestled as "El Zorro", based on the fictional Zorro vigilante. The character was shortlived and soon after Jesús Martínez took over the role of El Zorro. Once he gave up the El Zorro character, he began working as "Tarzan Boy", a mid-card tecnico character.

World Wrestling Federation (1998–1999)
Toscano was one of several Mexican wrestlers who worked for the World Wrestling Federation's (WWF) Super Astros television program. He was billed as "Armando Fernandez", portraying a variation of his Latin heart-throb character. His first match took place on August 24, 1998, as he defeated Sho Funaki, in a dark match before Shotgun Saturday Night. His last match for the WWF was on March 15, 1999, as he defeated El Bandido on a Super Astros match.

Consejo Mundial de Lucha Libre (1998–2011)
He was turned rudo and aligned with Rey Bucanero and Último Guerrero to form Los Guerreros del Infierno. Los Guerreros del Infierno feuded with Los Nuevos Infernales (Satánico, Averno, and Mephisto), the stable that Bucanero and Ultimo had recently abandoned.

Tarzan was programmed with Satánico, while Bucanero and Último were programmed with Averno and Mephisto. The rudo turn proved to be a great move because Tarzan Boy was finally accepted as a headliner and the fans took to his heel turn since they had been booing him as a face. Tarzan later joined a couple of other stables. He joined La Furia del Norte with Héctor Garza, Perro Aguayo Jr., and El Terrible; and later joined Los Perros del Mal with Perro Aguayo Jr., Héctor Garza and others. During his career, Tarzan has won the hair of Satánico twice, Negro Casas, Pirata Morgan, Pierroth Jr., and Brazo de Plata, among others. He has lost his hair twice, once to Shocker on September 19, 2003, at the Arena México, and more recently to Naito in the main event of the 2009 Infierno en el Ring event.

Perros del Mal / AAA (2011–2013)
After leaving CMLL, Toscano made his debut for the Perros del Mal promotion on November 12, 2011. In early 2012 he lost a six-way match to Hector Garza, where the winner would get a match for the Mexican National Heavyweight Championship.

On December 8, 2011, Toscano appeared at a press conference, where it was announced that he was joining CMLL's rival promotion AAA, becoming the third CMLL worker, after Héctor Garza and El Texano Jr., to leave the promotion for AAA within a 30-day period. Toscano made his AAA debut on December 16 at Guerra de Titanes, forming a group known as El Consejo ("The Council") with former CMLL wrestler Texano Jr. and Máscara Año 2000 Jr. On January 21, 2012, Mortiz and Semental joined El Consejo, pushing the storyline that the group was against both the tecnicos and rudos of AAA.  El Consejos first big match in AAA took place on March 18 at Rey de Reyes, where Toscano, El Texano Jr., and Máscara Año 2000 Jr. defeated AAA representatives Dr. Wagner Jr., Electroshock and Heavy Metal, following interference from the stable's newest member, El Hombre de Negro. On May 19, Toscano, El Texano Jr., and Máscara Año 2000 Jr. defeated Los Psycho Circus (Monster Clown, Murder Clown, and Psycho Clown), again after interference from El Hombre de Negro, to win the AAA World Trios Championship. On June 16, El Hombre de Negro unmasked and revealed himself as Máscara Año 2000. On December 21, Toscano seemingly quit El Consejo, after inadvertently costing the stable a non-title match against Los Psycho Circus, after which he came to blows with El Texano Jr. However, he later claimed to still be a part of El Consejo, claiming that his problems were with the group's new leader, Silver King, while also trying to convince El Texano Jr. and Máscara Año 2000 Jr. to take his side in the matter. On February 18, 2013, El Consejo lost the AAA World Trios Championship back to Los Psycho Circus, when Toscano turned on El Texano Jr.

Toscano then formed a partnership with Alan Stone and El Elegido, named Los Mirreyes (loosely translated to "The Rich Kids"). On March 17, Toscano was eliminated from the 2013 Rey del Ring tournament, pinned by El Canek. Toscano worked his last AAA match on December 20, 2013, teaming with El Hijo del Fantasma and Steve Pain in a loss to Fénix, Angélico, and Jack Evans.

International Wrestling Revolution Group (2000–2019)
Starting in 2000, Toscano has worked for International Wrestling Revolution Group (IWRG) off-and-on since then. His contracts with CMLL and AAA granted him the ability to work for independent circuit promotions for nights when CMLL or AAA did not have him scheduled for a show. On October 9, 2008, Toscano was one of ten wrestlers vying for a match for the IWRG Rey del Ring Championship in an elimination match, where each eliminated wrestler would remain around the ring with a leather strap to use. The match was won by Máscara Año 2000 Jr., with Toscano being the last man eliminated.

In 2012, Toscano worked IWRG's annual Guerra de Sexos show, teaming with Texano Jr. to defeat Los Junior Dinamitas (Cien Caras Jr. and Máscara Año 2000 Jr.) on the undercard of the show. The following year Toscano was one of 16 wrestlers risking their mask or hair at IWRG's Guerra del Golfo event. Toscano escaped the steel cage match without losing his hair, as Chico Che lost to Apolo Estrada Jr. at the end of the show. He returned to IWRG in 2014, starting with that year's Guerra del Golfo event. In late 2015 he returned to IWRG once more, this time for a month-long run of regular appearances and storyline feuds. He was forced to team up with Diva Salvaje for a Ruleta de la Muerte (Roulette of death) tournament, where the loser in the final would be forced to be shaved bald. Toscano and Diva Salvaje defeated Danny Casas and X-Fly in the semi-final to keep their hair safe. Following the tournament, Toscano became involved in a feud with Veneno, which led to Toscano defeating Veneno in a Lucha de Apuestas match in the main event of the 53rd Anniversary of Lucha Libre in Estado de México show. In the following weeks, Toscano turned on Danny Casas, in a feud that led to Casas defeating Toscano in a Lucha de Apuestas match on January 3, 2016, at the IWRG 20th Anniversary Show. After keeping his hair safe twice at the end of 2015, he lost the match to Casas and was forced to have his hair shaved off. Toscano would gain a measure of revenge several months later, at the 2016 Festival de las Máscaras, Toscano defeated Danny Casas, forcing Casas to have his hair shaved off.

In late 2018, Toscano risked his hair against Mr. Electro and Máscara Año 2000 Jr., in a match where Máscara Año 2000 Jr. risked his hair and Mr. Electro risked the IWRG Intercontinental Heavyweight Championship at IWRG's Arena Naucalpan 41st Anniversary Show. In the end, Máscara Año 2000 Jr. pinned Mr. Electro to win the championship. Two weeks later, at the IWRG 23rd Anniversary Show, Máscara Año 2000 Jr. defeated Toscano in a Lucha de Apuestas match, leaving Toscano bald after the match. Two months later, Toscano and Eragon wrestled Aramís and Imposible for the IWRG Intercontinental Tag Team Championship but lost the match.

Championships and accomplishmentsAsistencia Asesoría y AdministraciónAAA World Trios Championship (1 time) – with Máscara Año 2000 Jr. and El Texano Jr.Consejo Mundial de Lucha LibreCMLL World Trios Championship (2 times) – with Héctor Garza and El Terrible (1) and Último Guerrero and Atlantis (1)
NWA World Light Heavyweight Championship (1 time)
Leyenda de Azul: 2003Pro Wrestling IllustratedPWI ranked him #65 of the 500 best singles wrestlers of the PWI 500 in 2006.World Wrestling Organization'
WWO World Tag Team Championship (1 time) – with Zorro

Luchas de Apuestas record

Footnotes

References

External links
AAA profile, archived October 23, 2012

1973 births
Living people
Mexican male professional wrestlers
Professional wrestlers from Nuevo León
Sportspeople from Monterrey
AAA World Trios Champions
CMLL World Trios Champions
20th-century professional wrestlers
21st-century professional wrestlers
NWA World Light Heavyweight Champions